Enrique Wilson Libertario Rapesta Fabregat (April 12, 1919 - June 2009) was an Argentine gymnast who competed in the 1948 Summer Olympics.

References

Gymnasts at the 1948 Summer Olympics
Olympic gymnasts of Argentina
2009 deaths
1919 births
Pan American Games medalists in gymnastics
Pan American Games gold medalists for Argentina
Pan American Games silver medalists for Argentina
Pan American Games bronze medalists for Argentina
Gymnasts at the 1951 Pan American Games
Gymnasts at the 1955 Pan American Games
Argentine male artistic gymnasts
Medalists at the 1951 Pan American Games
Medalists at the 1955 Pan American Games
Sportspeople from Buenos Aires Province
20th-century Argentine people